Roberts Bank is home to a twin-terminal port facility located on the mainland coastline of the Strait of Georgia in Delta, British Columbia, Canada. Opened in 1970 with Westshore Terminals as its only tenant, Roberts Bank was expanded in 1983–84, and in June 1997 opened a second terminal, the GCT Deltaport container facility.

Part of Port of Vancouver, Roberts Bank is also known as the Outer Harbour of Canada's busiest port. Westshore is the busiest single coal export terminal in North America and is operated by the Westar Group on a long-term contract. It typically ships over 20 million tonnes of export coal a year and early in 2010 completed a $49-million equipment upgrade, bringing its capacity from 24 million to 29 million tonnes per year.

Some of this coal is metallurgical coal from mines in the interior of British Columbia, some of which are operated by Teck Resources. This coal mined within British Columbia pays a provincial carbon tax on its embodied emissions. However, some of the coal exported through the Roberts Bank is mined within the United States, and is exported through Canada to China. Communities along the West Coast of the United States have rejected proposals for coal export terminals for environmental reasons, and so the Roberts Bank Superport is the only way for coal producers in the Powder River Basin to export coal to Asia. The American coal exported through Roberts Bank does not pay a provincial carbon tax. This practice has been criticized by environmentalists in British Columbia.

Like the Tsawwassen Ferry Terminal to the southeast, Roberts Bank was built at the end of a long causeway over a shallow bank. Originally created as a  pod of reclaimed land for a major coal port, it is now four times that size. In January 2010, Deltaport added a third berth and doubled its capacity. It is now one of the busiest import/export ports in North America and a major hub for container trucking companies.

Roberts Bank is serviced by the Robert's Bank Rail Corridor, which serves CN Rail, CP Rail, and BNSF Railway trains. It opened on April 16 1970 under the B.C. Harbours Board. Additionally, Seaspan International provides tugboat services to both terminals at peninsula.

Incidents 

On December 7, 2012, the Panama-registered and Japan-owned bulk carrier Cape Apricot crashed into a causeway at the Westshore coal terminal, destroying about 100 metres of the structure, including a coal conveyor system, according to the  Vancouver Sun.
Port Metro Vancouver's Harbour Master said that this was first marine accident in the 42-year history of the coal terminal.
The accident resulted in an estimated 30 tonnes of coal going into the water from the severed conveyor and the disabling of the larger of the terminal's two coal-loading berths. It was estimated that reconstruction of the conveyor system would be completed by March 31, 2013. The berth was returned to service in February 2013. Reconstruction of the causeway was completed in late April 2013.

References

External links 

 GCT Canada Limited Partnership, operators of the Port Metro Vancouver's GCT Deltaport, under a long-term lease agreement. 
 The Canadian Encyclopedia entry for Delta, British Columbia
 Westshore Terminals Limited Partnership

Ports and harbours of British Columbia
Buildings and structures in Delta, British Columbia
Container terminals
Coal terminals
Coal in Canada
Foreign trade of the United States
Foreign trade of China
Transport in Delta, British Columbia